The Taste of Chicago (also known locally as  The Taste) is the world's largest food festival, held for five days in July in Chicago, Illinois in Grant Park. The event is also the largest festival in Chicago. Non-food-related events include live music on multiple stages, including the Petrillo Music Shell, pavilions, and performances. Musical acts vary from nationally known artists like Carlos Santana, Moby, Kenny Rogers, or Robert Plant to name just a few, to local artists. Since 2008, The Chicago Country Music Festival was held simultaneously with the Taste of Chicago but now has its own two-day festival, typically held in the fall. The Taste of Chicago also has rides present which may include a Ferris wheel and the Jump to Be Fit among others.

History

Arnie Morton, creator of the Taste, decided to line up Chicago restaurants to participate and persuaded then-Chicago mayor Jane Byrne and Commissioner of Cultural Affairs Lois Weisberg to block off Michigan Avenue for the first Taste of Chicago on July 4, 1980. Although organizers expected 100,000 people, a crowd of over 250,000 showed up, with food and soda sales grossing $300,000 at the festival's inception. The next year, the Taste of Chicago was moved to Grant Park and grew in size and scope, becoming a 10-day event with more food vendors and musical performers; it also became the world's largest food festival.

ChicagoFest, started by mayor Michael Bilandic, was the precursor to the Taste of Chicago. After Bilandic's tenure in office, newly elected Mayor Jane Byrne attempted to end the festival as well as many other programs associated with the former mayor. Many Chicagoans disapproved of Mayor Byrne's attempt to stop the festivities (although attendance at ChicagoFest had begun to wane). She and her successor, Mayor Harold Washington, dedicated more time and energy to promoting the Taste, slowly phasing ChicagoFest out in the process. Mayor Washington finally put an end to ChicagoFest when in 1983 it was moved from Navy Pier to Soldier Field and attendance continued to wane. The popularity of the Taste of Chicago has prompted other cities to spawn numerous offshoots and equivalents throughout North America such as the Taste of Champaign, CityFest in Detroit, the Taste of the Danforth in Toronto, the Taste of Kalamazoo, Taste of Addison, Taste of Denver, Taste in Dallas, Taste of Madison, Taste of Austin, the Taste of Peoria in Peoria, Illinois, and the Bite in Portland to name a few. The first "taste of" festival was Taste of Cincinnati in 1979.

In 2005, the Taste attracted about 3.9 million people with over 70 food vendors. Foods at the event include Chicago-style pizza, Chicago hot dogs, barbecued ribs, Italian Beef, Maxwell Street Polish Sausage, Eli's Cheesecake, and a variety of ethnic and regional foods.  A total of 3.6 million people visited the 2006 Taste of Chicago. Attendance for the previous record 10-day event, in 2004, was 3.59 million, with $12.33 million in revenue. These lackluster statistics prompted several changes. The mayor transferred power over the event from the Chicago Park District to the Department of Cultural Affairs and Special Events, and the event was shortened to 5 days. In 2012, the Taste of Chicago ran from July 11 to July 15 and had 36 participating restaurants. In 2013, the Taste of Chicago turned a profit for the first time in six years with sales totaling $272,000. On Saturday, July 12, 2014, the Taste of Chicago closed because of severe weather—the first time the festival was canceled for the entire day because of "excessive rainfall and flooding on the festival grounds".

In June 2020, the event was one of several Chicago events officially cancelled due to the COVID-19 pandemic; it was replaced by "Taste of Chicago To-Go" programming that included an online directory of vendors, video cooking demonstrations and performances, a food truck procession, and an expansion of the existing Community Eats program that brings free meals to first responders.

2007 salmonella outbreak
On July 12, 2007, city officials reported that an outbreak beginning in the Pars Cove Persian Cuisine booth caused 17 people to fall ill due to Salmonella poisoning.  Of those affected, three were hospitalized, including one minor. City officials started to receive reports of sickness on Monday but waited to issue a notice until Wednesday.  The notice warned the public about symptoms and causes behind the bacteria that is spread by consuming foods contaminated with animal feces. After a thorough investigation of the Pars Cove Persian Cuisine booth, it was determined that the cucumber, hummus, and pomegranate chicken were the source of the illness.  The booth failed a previous routine inspection for serving undercooked dishes but city officials did not file the report until Wednesday. City health inspectors found several violations at the restaurant including unsanitary conditions, improper refrigeration, and mouse droppings.

List of musical performers
The festival hosts a wide variety of performers.

References

External links

 Taste of Chicago

Cuisine of Chicago
Music festivals in Chicago
Food and drink festivals in the United States